Jagannathan Kaushik (born 25 October 1985) is an Indian first-class cricketer who plays for Tamil Nadu. He made his first-class debut for Tamil Nadu in the 2011–12 Ranji Trophy on 17 November 2011.  Kaushik was the 4th highest wicket taker in 2011–12 Ranji Trophy, where he took 28 wickets in 7 matches.  He was born in Chennai, Tamil Nadu to Jagannathan who retired from Bharat Heavy Electricals Limited and Bragadambal who retired from BSNL.  He has an elder brother Karthik Jagannathan who works as a business analyst in Brussels, Belgium.  Kaushik is married to Subashree Sivaramakrishnan who is a software engineer from Chennai.  They have a baby daughter named Shraddha and they currently live in Mandaveli, Chennai.

Kaushik did his primary schooling in St.John's Senior Secondary School, Mandaveli and did his high schooling in St. Bede's Anglo Indian school in Santhome.  He chose his high school mainly because of his passion for cricket since

childhood.  He always received constant recognition from his schools for being a star cricketer.  He did his B.E in

Electronics and Communication engineering from SSN college of engineering, Chennai and moved on to get his MBA

from SRM college of engineering.  After a successful cricketing career playing for Income Tax department in Chennai, he recently moved to Australia with his family to pursue his passion overseas.

References

External links
 

1985 births
Living people
Indian cricketers
Tamil Nadu cricketers